Charan Raj is an Indian actor, director, film producer, and writer who works in Kannada, Tamil, Telugu, Malayalam, Odia and Hindi movies.

Career
Charan Raj is a versatile actor who is popular for his villainy and character roles in South Indian film industry. Charanraj started his movie career with Kannada movie Parajitha (1982) directed by Siddalingaiah which became commercially hit cinema. Charan Raj is not only an actor, but a producer, music composer and director too. He is popular for his villainy roles in Telugu film industry starting his career in Telugu with Pratighatana (1985), Indrudu Chandrudu (1989) with Kamal Haasan and Karthavyam (1990) with Vijayashanti. He has also acted with Rajinikanth in the Hindi movie Phool Bane Angaray (1991) and Tamil films like Panakkaran (1990), Dharma Dorai (1991), Veera (1994) and Baashha (1995). His character role in Tamil film Gentleman (1993) showed him as a different Charan Raj and he got good applause for his performance in that film. He made his debut as a director in 1999, through the film Annan Thangachi. In this film he acted as the hero as well as did the direction. The film did not hit the box office, though it had a good story. He has also acted as Suriya’s father in the film Vel (2007) with Saranya Ponvannan as his pair.

Controversy
In 2014, Charan Raj was accused of carrying a gun at Sri Varasiddhi Vinayak Temple, Andhra Pradesh.

Partial filmography

Kannada

Parajitha(1982)
Prema Parva (1983)
Aasha (1983) 
Thaliya Bhagya (1984)
Thayiya Hone (1985)
Maruthi Mahime (1985)
Africadalli Sheela (1986) as Shankar
Hrudaya Pallavi (1987)
Gandhada Gudi Part 2 (1994)
Samara (1995)
Thavarina Thottilu (1996)
God Father (1996)
Annavra Makkalu (1996)
Mahabharata (1997)
CBI Durga (1997)
Soorappa (2000)
Papigala Lokadalli (2000)
Mafia (2001)
Daddy No. 1 (2002)
Shri Renuka Devi (2003)
Ondagona Baa (2003)
Good, Bad and Ugly (2005)
Gadipar (2005)
Tirupathi (2006)
Mr. Theertha (2010)
Swayam Krushi (2011)
Shikari (2012)
 Balaraju Aadi Bamardi (2012)
 Yadartha Prema Katha (2012)
Raja Huli (2013)
 Paisa (2014)
 Rathavara (2015)
 Preethiya Raayabhari (2018)
 Gadinaadu (2020)
 Berklee (2021)
 Ek love Ya (2022)

Tamil

Telugu
Actor

Pratighatana (1985) as Kali
Kotigadu (1986)
Aranyakanda (1986)
America Abbayi (1987)
Donga Mogudu (1987)
Swayam Krushi (1987) as Govind
Indrudu Chandrudu (1987)
Maa Inti Katha (1990)
Surya IPS (1991)
Karthavyam (1991) as Kashipati
Aashayam (1993) as Sagar
Gaayam (1993) as Mohana Krishna
Hello Brother (1994)
Palnati Pourusham (1994)
Police Brothers (1994)
Chilakapachcha Kaapuram (1995) as Bullebbayi
Peddannayya (1997) as Bhaskar Rayudu
Egire Paavurama (1997)
Rana (1998)
Suryudu (1998)
Vamshoddharakudu (2000) as Sudarshan Rao
Adavi Chukka (2000) as Arjun
Amma Nagamma (2001) as Amar
Naa Alludu (2005)
Athadu (2005) as Police  Officer
Asadhyudu (2006)
Current (2009)
Em Pillo Em Pillado (2010)
Komaram Puli (2010)
Yadartha Prema Katha (2012)
Adhinayakudu (2012)
Paisa (2014)

Hindi
Pratighaat as Kali Prasad (1987)
Kudrat Ka Kanoon (1987) as  MLA Charan Das
Kahan Hai Kanoon (1989) as Raja/Gatarchaap, smuggler
Phool Bane Angaray (1991) as Charan Raj Prasad
Parakrami (1991) Unreleased Movie
Hafta Bandh (1991)
Police Aur Mujrim (1992) as Banarasi Das
I Love You (1992) as Kishen dad
Tejasvini (1994) as Police Officer Pandey
Mafia (1996) as Gawda
Husn Ke Lootere (2001) as Jairam

Odia
Ja Devi Sarva Bhuteshu (1989)

Malayalam
 Oliyambukal (1990)
 Lelam (1997) as John Marudhanayagam
India Gate 
 Red Indians (2001) as Jacky/Jackson
 Pokkiri Raja as Maniannan
 Madhura Raja as Maniannan

Director
Annan Thangachi (1999)
Yadartha Prema Katha (2012)

Awards
Nandi Awards
 Nandi Award for Best Villain - Pratighatana (1985)

References

External links
 

Living people
Indian male film actors
Male actors from Karnataka
Male actors in Kannada cinema
Male actors in Tamil cinema
Male actors in Malayalam cinema
Male actors in Odia cinema
Telugu film producers
People from Belagavi district
1958 births
Tamil film directors
Male actors in Hindi cinema
Male actors in Telugu cinema
20th-century Indian male actors
21st-century Indian male actors
Screenwriters from Karnataka